In Uruguay, Nostalgia Night (Spanish: Noche de la Nostalgia) is an annual celebration of music from the past. It is celebrated every 24 August. All dance clubs, radio stations, and many other events play "golden oldies" (oldies).

Overview
Its origins are somewhat disputed. It started on 24 August 1978. According to José Fernández, owner of the Disco Ton Ton Metek, as 24 August is the day before Uruguayan Independence Day, a national holiday, he once proposed to Pablo Lecueder (director of the broadcast program Old Hits, then at CX32 Radiomundo) to do something on the night that could be commercially profitable.

On the night of 24 August 1978, the first Nostalgia Night was held in Ton Ton; this is disputed. The idea caught on and became part of Uruguayan folklore.

Uruguayans are said to be typically nostalgic. It may be for this reason that Nostalgia Night is such a success that it was made an official celebration by the Ministry of Tourism.

History 

On August 24, 1978, Pablo Lecueder, owner of CX-32 Radiomundo, organized a party with "old music hits", which was the theme of his radio show "Old Hits". Starting in 1978, every year Lecueder used the eve of the holiday August 25 (Uruguayan Declaration of Independence), a holiday in Uruguay, to make the party remember and dance to "golden oldies" with the original denomination, registered trademark, and National holiday called "The Night of Nostalgia".

The idea of these first parties was to dance with the music of the late 1960s and early 1970s. The tunes of Queen, Simon and Garfunkel, Cat Stevens, The Beatles, Dire Straits, Supertramp, Elvis Presley, Barry Manilow, Bee Gees, and John Travolta are common—disco music, the new romantics, etc. From the first days of August, the radios broadcast those successes and spread the "old music". Over the years, themes from the 1980s of artists such as Mikko Mission, David Lime, Baltimora, Madonna, Tony Peret, Mike Platinas, etc., and music from the 1990s, such as Technotronic, Snap, 2unlimited, etc were added. In the words of Lecueder, nostalgia begins 10 years after a song is published.

Over the years, businessmen of the entertainment sector, friends, family, began to host nostalgia parties. Different parties for different audiences, with a wide range of prices, reunion parties, show dinners and even anti-nostalgia parties for those who want to go out that day and don't identify with the theme.

Today, this event is an important commercial focus in the entertainment field, promoting restaurants, disco s, DJ's, waiters, companies of gastronomy, rental of infrastructure for parties, security services, lighting, amplification, transport, promoters and even lingerie houses and high-turnover hotels, with special promotions.

Together with the Christmas and New Year's Eve parties, the night of Nostalgia Night brings more people to parties. It is even considered that people at the end of the year parties are surpassed in movement, since on that day they usually leave both older and young, married and single, to remember "the good old days", depending on their age.

This party is held throughout Uruguay and in each department or city there are between 15 and 30 parties.

References

Events in Uruguay
Uruguayan culture
August observances
Nostalgia
Winter events in Uruguay